Zénaïde Laetitia Julie Bonaparte, Princess of Canino and Musignano (8 July 1801 – 8 August 1854) was the elder daughter of Joseph Bonaparte and Julie Clary, and the wife of Charles Lucien Bonaparte, who was also her cousin. She joined her father in exile for several years in Bordentown, New Jersey.

Biography 

When she was 14, in 1815, Napoleon offered Zénaïde in marriage to Ferdinand, the deposed king of Spain, but the offer was refused.

After the fall of her uncle Emperor Napoleon in 1815, her father moved to America and purchased "Point Breeze", an estate on the Delaware River near Bordentown, New Jersey. Zénaïde and her sister, however, stayed with their mother in Europe. They lived in Frankfurt and Brussels in 1815–1821, and then in Florence. 

On 29 June 1822, in Brussels, she married her cousin Charles Lucien Bonaparte, son of her uncle Lucien. Her father Joseph had suggested the marriage to his wife when Zénaïde was only five; the idea was to carry on the Napoleonic succession (a return to power was always anticipated) by marrying his two daughters to sons of two of his brothers.

The wedding was met with surprisingly little fanfare, perhaps because Zénaïde's mother was outraged at the excessive sum of the dowry (730,000 francs, which was unreasonable considering that Lucien's villa in Rome had cost only 150,000), which had strained her resources. 

Charles was an ornithologist (who named the Zenaida doves after her). They had twelve children, listed below.

Issue

Ancestry

References

Bibliography 
Glover, Michael, The Peninsular War 1807–1814. London: Penguin Books, 2001. 
Stroud, Patricia Tyson. The Emperor of Nature: Charles-Lucien Bonaparte and His World. Philadelphia: University of Pennsylvania Press, 2000. .

External links 

1801 births
1854 deaths
Zenaide Laetitia Julie Bonaparte
People from Bordentown, New Jersey
Zenaide Laetitia Julie Bonaparte
Daughters of kings